Edward Layton may refer to:
 Edward Layton (footballer), English footballer
 Edward Layton (priest), English Anglican priest
 Eddie Layton, organ player at Yankee Stadium